Night Eternal is the eighth studio album by Portuguese gothic metal band Moonspell, released on 16 May 2008 in Europe and on 10 June 2008 in North America. It was pre-produced in Portugal with Waldemar Sorychta from 16 to 30 November 2007 and recorded in Denmark at Antfarm studio from 7 to 31 January 2008.

Tracklist

Limited edition bonus tracks

Limited edition bonus DVD

Personnel 

Moonspell
 Fernando Ribeiro – vocals
 Ricardo Amorim – guitars
 Pedro Paixão – keyboards, samples, guitars
 Miguel Gaspar – drums

Additional musicians
 Niclas Etelävuori – bass
 Patrícia Andrade – choir vocals
 Sophia Vieira – choir vocals
 Carmen Susana Simões – choir vocals

Production
 Adriano Esteves – logo
 Natalie Shau – model
 Jorge Pina – choir recording
 Pedro Paixão – recording
 Waldemar Sorychta – pre-production, arrangements
 Jacob Olsen – additional engineering
 Fernando Ribeiro – executive producer
 Seth Siro Anton – artwork
 Tue Madsen – producer, engineering, mixing, mastering
 Edgar Keats – photography

Charts

References 

2008 albums
Moonspell albums
SPV/Steamhammer albums
Albums produced by Tue Madsen
Albums with cover art by Spiros Antoniou